Five Iron Frenzy 2: Electric Boogaloo is the fourth full-length studio album of the band Five Iron Frenzy. It was released November 20, 2001 on Five Minute Walk records.

Overview
Five Iron continued their tradition of tongue-in-cheek lyrics on songs such as "Pre-Ex-Girlfriend" and "You Can't Handle This". The album also tackles serious issues, elevating the social commentary to what HM characterized as a "new level of brutal honesty." "Far, Far Away" was inspired by The Seekers song "Come the Day" and "The Day We Killed" by Dee Brown's book Bury My Heart at Wounded Knee. The latter song references Crazy Horse, an Indian chief, to speak about racism toward Native Americans. Another theme visited on this album is consumerism in "Vultures" and "Blue Mix". "Blue Mix" specifically addresses practices of the music industry which Roper sees as disparaging when copied within the Christian music industry. Practices attacked include blue mixing, or limiting opening bands sound so that the headliners sound the best, and merchandising controls that raise profit margins at the expense of the band's freedom. As Roper stated to HM: "It really bothers me how often that happens in the Christian industry... it's not okay to do that kind of stuff."  "Car" is dedicated to the memory of Carlos Ortega, brother of Leanor. It references a poem by E.E. Cummings to remind the listener that each day is a blessing to be cherished.

According to the band, "the '2' in the title doesn't signify anything, it is simply a reference to 1984's breakdancing film, Breakin' 2: Electric Boogaloo."

Track listing
 (Credits adapted from album's liner notes)

Music credits

Five Iron Frenzy
 Reese Roper – lead vocals
 Micah Ortega – lead guitar
 Sonnie Johnston – guitar
 Keith Hoerig – bass
 Andrew Verdecchio – drums
 Nathanael "Brad" Dunham – trumpet
 Dennis Culp – trombone
 Leanor Ortega "Jeff the Girl" – saxophone

Additional musicians
 Bret Barker (of The W's)
 Aaron James
 Michael Jon Leonardi
 Justin McRoberts
 Mary Joan Thyken
 Mindy Verdecchio

Production
 Masaki Liu – producer, engineer, mastering
 Five Iron Frenzy – producer
 Micah Ortega – assistant engineer
 Bret Barker – assistant engineer
 Shively – assistant engineer
 Frank Tate – executive producer
 Aaron James – art direction and layout
 Melinda DiMauro – photography

References

Five Iron Frenzy albums
2001 albums